Ger Feeney ( 1954 – 10 October 2010) was an Irish Gaelic footballer who played for the Mayo county team.

Personal life
Feeney was a native of Cortoon, Ballintubber, and studied at Ballinafad College. He was a highly regarded GAA player in the 1970s. He won a minor All-Ireland title in 1971 and an U21 winners medal in 1974. He made his championship debut for Mayo in 1972 against Sligo at McHale Park, Castlebar.

His sons Richie and Alan Feeney, and his nephew, John Feeney, are all members of the Mayo football squad. One of his brothers was a Mayo county secretary, Sean Feeney.

Death
He and his close friend, businessman Donal McEllin, drowned in a boating accident off Inishbofin in October 2010.

Feeney was survived by his wife Kathleen (née Caden) and their four children, Richie, Alan, Claire and Darragh (14 at the time), who was in St Gerald's College, Castlebar at the time of his father's death.

References

External links
 Death notice at RIP.ie

1950s births
2010 deaths
Year of birth uncertain
Accidental deaths in the Republic of Ireland
Boating accident deaths
Mayo inter-county Gaelic footballers
People educated at St Gerald's College, Castlebar